Jack Phillips may refer to:

Jack Phillips (wireless officer) (1887–1912), senior wireless operator on the RMS Titanic
Jack Phillips (first baseman) (1921–2009), Major League Baseball first baseman
Jack Phillips (pitcher) (1919–1958), Major League Baseball pitcher
Jack Phillips (footballer, born 1903), Welsh footballer
Jack Phillips (footballer, born 1993), English footballer
 Jack Phillips, party in Masterpiece Cakeshop v. Colorado Civil Rights Commission

See also
John Phillips (disambiguation)